Kelly Huang (born Huang Yu-hsien) is a Taiwanese actress.

Filmography

Television series

References

External links

 
 

1980 births
21st-century Taiwanese actresses
Living people